Veniamin Efimovich Basner (1 January 1925 in Yaroslavl – 3 September 1996 in St Petersburg) was a Russian composer. He was recognized by the Soviet Union as a People's Artist of Russia and a State prize-winner. An asteroid called 4267 Basner, discovered in 1971, was named in his honour. He was a member of the St Petersburg Union of Composers.

Early life and initial success
Veniamin Basner had been playing the violin from the age of six and graduated from the Leningrad Conservatory in 1949 with the violin as his principal instrument.

Basner made his first experiments in composition at the age of fifteen.

In 1955 he was a prize-winner, for his Second String Quartet, at the International Composers' Competition in Warsaw. Biographer Alexander Uteshev has remarked that this marked the start of his most intense period of creative activity.

Basner and Shostakovich
Veniamin Basner, while still a student, met Dmitri Shostakovich, under whose advice his formation as a professional composer was furthered. They became personal friends. Basner’s widow, Lusha Basner, has elaborated on how Basner became Shostakovich’s student: "Basner wanted to take composition lessons from Shostakovich, but didn’t dare to approach him. Shostakovich, who was a sensitive person, noticed this and helped Basner by asking him to light his cigarette. That’s how Shostakovich became Basner’s teacher."

Another in his circle of friends was Mieczysław Weinberg who, as revealed by Lusha Basner, entrusted his archive to Basner after he was released from his arrest in 1953. At the time Basner held an influential position in the Composers’ Union - and "Weinberg trusted him."

Much later, Basner and Weinberg were amongst the six friends of Shostakovich (the others being Kara Karayev, Yury Levitin, Karen Khachaturian, and Boris Tishchenko) who rejected the controversial Testimony (Свидетельство), said to be the "authenticated memoirs of Dmitri Shostakovich." (As stated in the article on Testimony.)

Compositions

Basner’s musical output spanned a wide spectrum in terms of genre and emotional substance. It encompasses, at the more academic end, thirteen works for musical theatre, symphonic suites, three symphonies, vocal symphonic cycles, two concertos and five quartets, which have been performed to critical acclaim in Russia and beyond. At a more popular level, he became widely known, reaching millions of people through his film music - for more than a hundred productions - and his over three hundred song compositions.

He drew particular inspiration from the events and pathos of the Second World War in works which, as Uteshev puts it, express simultaneously the “confession of a lonely soul as well as a voice of national grief.” The Fourth Quartet and Violin Sonata particularly evoke the pain of personal loss - as does, for example, the song On The Nameless Height (На безымянной высоте), based on a real event and is about three soldiers, fifteen of whose friends had died in battle. Melodies from his well-known songs are woven into more substantial works such as the Second Symphony and the Fifth Quartet.

The most important and impressive quality of Veniamin Basner's music, suggests Uteshev, is “an inspired lyricism [which] powerfully permeates all his art.”

Recordings

Recordings include:
 Suites for Films The Immortal Garrison, "The Leningrad Symphony", Destiny of a Man – performed by the Academic Symphonic Orchestra of the Leningrad Philharmonic.
 String Quartets recorded by the Taneyev Quartet.
 Valery Gavrilin recorded a ‘’First German Notebook’’ in 1981, with Sergei Leiferkus (baritone) and Irina Golovnyova (piano), Sound-producer Gerhard Tses. Included are recordings of songs by Vladimir Shcherbachov, Veniamin Basner, Yuri Falik. Compozitor, St. Petersburg
 In 2004 the Amsterdam-based Jewish Music Projects compiled (2004) a programme Zun mit a regn (Sun and Rain) - the Jewish element in the music of Mieczysław Weinberg, Veniamin Basner and Dmitri Shostakovich. Basner’s 1950 Poem for violin and piano (Opus 7 No 1) was featured. The programme was originally inspired by an invitation to participate in a St Petersburg festival commemorating the 80th anniversary of the birth of Veniamin Basner. CDs have subsequently been produced, in 2009, which also include three Russian songs by Basner from the 1994 musical Yevreiske Styastye (Jewish Luck) after the novel Mendel Marantz, by David Freedman, libretto by Boris Pantser.

References

External links
 

1925 births
1996 deaths
People from Yaroslavl
Russian Jews
Soviet Jews
Russian male classical composers
Russian film score composers
Soviet film score composers
Male film score composers
20th-century classical composers
20th-century Russian male musicians
Saint Petersburg Conservatory alumni
People's Artists of the RSFSR